Georgia Ellis (March 12, 1917 – March 30, 1988) was an American actress who is best known for her recurring role of Kitty in the Western radio drama Gunsmoke. She was the daughter of John R. Hawkins and Blanche E. Sparling. She married Karl E. Puttfarken in Los Angeles, California on June 30, 1961. The bride's name on the marriage record is listed as Georgia B. Hawkins.

Radio
In addition to her work on Gunsmoke, Ellis was a member of the cast of Rogers of the Gazette. She also appeared on CBS Radio Workshop.

Television
Ellis played a number of small roles on the Dragnet TV series in the 1950s.

Film
Ellis appeared in the films Dragnet (1954), Penny Serenade (1940), Doomed Caravan (1941), and Light of the Western Stars (1940).

Ellis also used the name Georgia Hawkins, making her film debut under that name in The Light of Western Stars. A news story at that time referred to her and another actress as "discoveries of Victor Jory."

References

External links
 

1917 births
1988 deaths
Actresses from California
American radio actresses
American television actresses
American film actresses
20th-century American actresses